Linn Grove is a city in Buena Vista County, Iowa, United States. The population was 163 at the time of the 2020 census. The nearby Chan-Ya-Ta Site contains the remains of a 1000-year-old prehistoric village, and is on the National Register of Historic Places.

History
A post office called Linn Grove has been in operation since 1877. Linn Grove was named for a grove of linden trees near the town site.

Geography
Linn Grove is located at  (42.892537, -95.241992). It is situated near the Little Sioux River.

Demographics

2010 census
As of the census of 2010, there were 154 people, 81 households, and 42 families residing in the city. The racial makeup of the city was 96.8% White, 0.6% African American, and 2.6% from other races. Hispanic or Latino of any race were 8.4% of the population.

There were 81 households, of which 17.3% had children under the age of 18 living with them, 44.4% were married couples living together, 2.5% had a female householder with no husband present, 4.9% had a male householder with no wife present, and 48.1% were non-families. 45.7% of all households were made up of individuals, and 16% had someone living alone who was 65 years of age or older. The average household size was 1.90 and the average family size was 2.67.

The median age in the city was 51.7 years. 16.9% of residents were under the age of 18; 4.5% were between the ages of 18 and 24; 12.9% were from 25 to 44; 48.6% were from 45 to 64; and 16.9% were 65 years of age or older. The gender makeup of the city was 48.1% male and 51.9% female.

2000 census
As of the census of 2000, there were 211 people, 89 households, and 56 families residing in the city. The racial makeup of the city was 91.47% White, 8.53% from other races. Hispanic or Latino of any race were 8.53% of the population.

There were 89 households, out of which 27.0% had children under the age of 18 living with them, 49.4% were married couples living together, 11.2% had a female householder with no husband present, and 36.0% were non-families. 32.6% of all households were made up of individuals, and 14.6% had someone living alone who was 65 years of age or older. The average household size was 2.37 and the average family size was 3.00.

In the city, the population was spread out, with 24.6% under the age of 18, 7.6% from 18 to 24, 26.1% from 25 to 44, 24.6% from 45 to 64, and 17.1% who were 65 years of age or older. The median age was 42 years. For every 100 females, there were 86.7 males. For every 100 females age 18 and over, there were 89.3 males.

The median income for a household in the city was $33,125, and the median income for a family was $38,438. Males had a median income of $29,500 versus $24,167 for females. The per capita income for the city was $22,945. About 3.1% of families and 5.3% of the population were below the poverty line, including none of those under the age of eighteen and 4.2% of those 65 or over.

Media
The local newspaper that covers events and news near Linn Grove is the Peterson Patriot.

Education
Sioux Central Community School District serves the community;

Previously it was served by the Linn Grove School District. In the early 1960s it consolidated with the Peterson School District to form the Sioux Valley School District. On July 1, 1993 the Sioux Valley district merged with the Sioux Rapids-Rembrandt School District to form the Sioux Central district.

Notable people

Stell Andersen, classical pianist
Rick Grapenthin, baseball player.

References

External links
 City website

Cities in Buena Vista County, Iowa
Cities in Iowa